Eileen Bell CBE (born 15 August 1943) is an Alliance Party politician from Dromara, Northern Ireland. She was a member of the Northern Ireland Assembly (MLA) for North Down from 1998 to 2007, and is a former deputy leader of the Alliance Party.

Early life
Bell was born in Dromara and grew up in West Belfast. She was educated at the Dominican College, Belfast and the University of Ulster. She held a number of jobs including working in the Civil Service and later as Welfare Officer for the Community of the Peace People.

Political career
In 1986 she became General Secretary of the Alliance Party. Later in 1993 she won election to North Down Borough Council. She was later elected as one of two "top-up" members of the 1996 Northern Ireland Peace Forum and in the 1998 Northern Ireland Assembly elections won a seat in North Down.

In June 2001 Bell was appointed Deputy Leader of the Alliance by Seán Neeson, following the resignation of Seamus Close over disagreements on the party's direction. However Neeson himself soon resigned and Bell stood for the leadership as a traditionalist bridge-building candidate, against David Ford who was on the more consciously Liberal, internationalist wing of the party. At the Party's council Bell received 45 votes to Ford's 86 and she remained as the party's deputy leader. In the 2003 Assembly elections she retained her seat.

On 10 December 2005 it was announced that Bell would stand down as Deputy Leader of the party and not contest the next Assembly elections.

Bell acted as the Speaker of the Assembly established by the Northern Ireland Act 2006 and of the Transitional Assembly established by the Northern Ireland (St Andrews Agreement) Act 2006. On 8 May 2006 she was appointed Speaker of the Northern Ireland Assembly (which had been suspended since 2002) only to be replaced that same day by William Hay.

Post Political career

After leaving political life Eileen Bell turned to a charity she had long supported and became vice president and Legislative Advisor to Autism NI.  She has been one of the driving forces behind a Lobby for an Autism Bill in Northern Ireland. She was also the chairperson of Downtown Women's Group which managed the Women into Politics Project. She stayed on as a board member of the group until it wound down in 2015.

Honours
She was appointed Commander of the Order of the British Empire (CBE) in the 2008 New Year Honours.

References

1943 births
Living people
People from County Down
Members of the Northern Ireland Forum
Northern Ireland MLAs 1998–2003
Northern Ireland MLAs 2003–2007
Alumni of Ulster University
Commanders of the Order of the British Empire
Female members of the Northern Ireland Assembly
Alliance Party of Northern Ireland MLAs
Speakers of the Northern Ireland Assembly
20th-century women politicians from Northern Ireland
Alliance Party of Northern Ireland councillors
Members of North Down Borough Council
Women councillors in Northern Ireland